Dante Booker (born October 9, 1977) is a former professional American football player. Booker grew up in Akron, Ohio, where he was a three-time all-city selection in High School basketball. Booker played college football at Montgomery Junior College prior to transferring to Auburn University, where he majored in sociology. Upon graduation, Booker pursued a career in professional football.

Professional career
Booker played for the BC Lions of the Canadian Football League his rookie season in the league. He attended the B.C.'s Abbotsford training camp the following season but was released prior to the start of the regular season. He was signed as a free agent by the Winnipeg Blue Bombers in May 2006. Following the 2006 CFL season, Booker signed to play indoor football with the Montgomery Bears of the American Indoor Football Association.

External links
Winnipeg Player Bio
Just Sports Stats

1977 births
Living people
Players of American football from Akron, Ohio
American football defensive linemen
Auburn Tigers football players
BC Lions players
Winnipeg Blue Bombers players
Canadian football defensive linemen
American players of Canadian football